There are 44 major rivers in Kerala, all but three originating in the Western Ghats. 41 of them flow westward and 3 eastward. The rivers of Kerala are small, in terms of length, breadth and water discharge. The rivers flow faster, owing to the hilly terrain and as the short distance between the Western Ghats and the sea. All the rivers are entirely monsoon-fed and many of them shrink into rivulets or dry up completely during summer.

Features

Kerala is wedged between the Lakshadweep Sea and the Western Ghats. Geographically, the state can be divided into three climatically distinct regions: the eastern highlands; rugged and cool mountainous terrain, the central mid-lands; rolling hills, and the western lowlands; coastal plains. The eastern region of Kerala consists of high mountains, gorges and deep-cut valleys immediately west of the Western Ghats' rain shadow. 41 of Kerala's west-flowing rivers, and 3 of its east-flowing ones originate in this region. The 41 west-flowing rivers, each of which having at least a length of 15 km, gradually slopes towards the Arabian Sea coast in the western region and empty either into backwaters or Arabian Sea there. The longer rivers have several tributaries and streams too. The Western Ghats form a wall of mountains interrupted only near Palakkad; hence also known Palghat, where the Palakkad Gap breaks. The river Bharathappuzha flows through the Palakkad Gap. The 3 east-flowing rivers also originate in Western Ghats, but flow eastwards either into Karnataka or Tamil Nadu.

Kerala's western coastal belt is relatively flat compared to the eastern region, and is criss-crossed by a network of interconnected brackish canals, lakes, estuaries, and rivers known as the Kerala Backwaters. Kuttanad, also known as The Rice Bowl of Kerala, has the lowest altitude in India, and is also one of the few places in world where cultivation takes place below sea level. Around eight percent of India's waterways are found in Kerala. Many of the rivers are small and entirely fed by monsoon rain. As Kerala's rivers are small and lacking in delta, they are more prone to environmental effects. The rivers face problems such as sand mining and pollution.

West flowing rivers
This is a list of the westward-flowing rivers of Kerala state in southern India, in order of length, and their tributaries. These rivers all originate in the Western Ghats range and flow westward into the Kerala Backwaters or into the Arabian Sea. Length in kilometers is in parentheses. Kasaragod district have the maximum number of west-flowing rivers in Kerala - 12.

Periyar River (244)
 Edamala River
 Cheruthoni River
 Mullayar River
 Muthirapuzha River
 Perinjankutti River
 Ambazhachal River
 Kaniyampuzha River
 Muttar River
 Panniyar
Bharatapuzha River (209)
 Thuthapuzha River 
 Kanjirappuzha
 Gayathripuzha River
 Kalpathipuzha River
 Kannadipuzha River  
Pamba River (176)
 Azhuthayar
 Kakkiyar
 Kakkattar
 Kallar
 Perunthenaruvi
 Madatharuvi
 Thanungattilthodu
 Kozhithodu
 Varattar
 Utharappalli River
 Kuttemperoor
Chaliyar River (169)
 Cherupuzha (Mavoor)
 Iruvanjippuzha
 Thottumukkam River
 Kuthirappuzha
 Kuruvanpuzha
 Karimpuzha
 Pandippuzha
 Neerppuzha
Chalakudy River (145)
Parambikulam River
Kadalundy River (130)
Achankoil River (128)
 Utharappalli River
 Kallada River (121)
Muvattupuzha River (121)
 Thodupuzha River
 Kothayar River
 Kaliyar River
 Kariyar River 
 Thevalakkadu River
 Uzhavoor River
Valapattanam River (110)
 Bavali River
 Pulloopi River
 Payyavoor River
 Mundayapuzha River 
 Veni River
 Aralam River
Chandragiri River (105)
 Kudumbur River
Manimala River (90)
Vamanapuram River (88)
Kuppam River (88)
 Kuttikol River 
Meenachil River (78)
 Meenachal River
 Kodoor River
 Karapuzha River
 Pulinackal River
 Moorkankavu River
Kuttiyadi River (74)
Karamana River (68)
Shiriya River (68)
Kariangode River (64)
 Chaithravahini River
Ithikkara River (56)
Neyyar River (56)
Mahe River (54)
 Mundathode River
Keecheri River (51)
Perumba River (51)
 Vayalapra River
Uppala River (50)
Karuvannur River (48)
Kurumali River
Manali River
Anjarakandy River (48)
Tirur River (48)
Neeleshwaram River (46)
Pallikkal River (42)
Kallayi River (40)
Korapuzha River (40)
Mogral River (34)
Kavvayi River (31)
Kankol
Vannathichal
Kuppithodu
Kuniyan
Thanikkudam River (29)
Thalassery River (28)
 Ummanchira River
Mamam river (27)
Chithari River (25)
Ramapuram River (19)
Ayiroor River (17)
Manjeswaram River (16)

East flowing rivers

There are three rivers rise in Kerala and flow eastwards, Kabini into Karnataka and the other two into Tamil Nadu. All the three rivers ultimately join the Kaveri river.
Kabani (57)
Bhavani (38)
Pambar (25)

See also
 List of dams and reservoirs in Kerala
 List of mountains in Kerala
 Kerala backwaters

References

Notes

 

 
Rivers, List of, Kerala
Kerala, List of rivers